Vincent Contenson (born at Altivillare (Gers), Diocese of Condon, 1641; died Creil-sur-Oise, 26 December 1674) was a French Dominican theologian and preacher.

His epitaph in the church of that place described him as "in years a youth, mature in wisdom and in virtue venerable". Despite his short life, he gave proof in his writings of considerable learning and won remarkable popularity by his pulpit utterances.

He was seventeen years old when he entered the Order of Preachers. After teaching philosophy for a time at Albi, and theology at Toulouse, he began a career of preaching as brilliant as it was brief. He was stricken in the pulpit at Creil, where he was giving a mission.

Works

His reputation as a theologian rests on a work entitled Theologia Mentis et Cordis, published posthumously at Lyons in nine volumes, 1681; second edition, 1687. The peculiar merit of his theology consists in an attempt to get away from the prevailing dry reasoning of Scholasticism and, while retaining the accuracy and solidity of its method, to embellish it with illustrations and images borrowed from the Church Fathers, that appeal to the heart as well as the mind.

References
His life is found in the fifth volume of the "Histoire des hommes illustres de l'ordre de Saint Dominique", by Père Touron.

 Henry John Rose, New General Biographical Dictionary (London, 1848)
 Louis Moréri, Le Grand Dictionaire historique (Paris, 1759)
 

1641 births
1674 deaths
17th-century French Catholic theologians
French Dominicans